Gladbeck West station is located in the German city of Gladbeck in the German state of North Rhine-Westphalia. It is on the Oberhausen-Osterfeld Süd–Hamm line and is classified by Deutsche Bahn as a category 4 station. The station was opened 1 May 1905 by the Prussian state railways.

It is served by Regional-Express service RE 14: Emscher-Münsterland-Express (Essen–Bottrop-Gladbeck-Dorsten), train part 1 Borken (Westf) / train part 2 Coesfeld (Westf) and Rhine-Ruhr S-Bahn line S 9 (Recklinghausen / Haltern–Wuppertal / Hagen).

Special 15 minutes tact RE 14 / S 9 :
(Gladbeck-West - Bottrop Hbf, Essen-Borbeck, Essen Hbf).

S 9 separation station Recklinghausen or GE-Buer, Marl, Haltern am See

It is also served by five bus routes: SB36, 253, 254 and 258 (all operated by Vestische Straßenbahnen every 20/30 minutes) and 188 (operated by Busverkehr Rheinland every 60 minutes).

Notes 

Rhine-Ruhr S-Bahn stations
S9 (Rhine-Ruhr S-Bahn)
Railway stations in Germany opened in 1905
Buildings and structures in Recklinghausen (district)